WBCQ-FM (94.7 FM) is a radio station licensed to Monticello, Maine, United States. The station is currently Broadcasting a locally originated Classic Country format with News and Weather at the top of the hour. WBCQ-FM resumed full-time as of October 7, 2013.

WBCQ-FM is owned by Barbara Weiner and Allan Weiner, who also owns the shortwave station WBCQ and AM station WXME.  For 5 years, County Communications, Inc. (and later Northern Maine Media) the owner of radio station WHOU-FM, operated WBCQ-FM under a local marketing agreement. That relationship ended April 2, 2013.

References

External links

BCQ-FM
Mass media in Aroostook County, Maine
Classic country radio stations in the United States
Radio stations established in 2008